Alfred Rainer (22 September 1987, in Saalfelden – 16 August 2008, in Innsbruck) was a World Cup competitor in the Nordic combined event.

He had previously been a soldier in the Austrian Army and a joiner.  He spoke both German and English and enjoyed a range of hobbies, including football, movies, music, skiing and bicycling.

Sporting success
In 2006 at the junior World Cup, Rainer was successful enough to gain a silver medal, then at the 2007 Junior World Championships Rainer won a team gold and two individual bronze medals.  He was then eligible for the national World Cup team, and started his career in Zakopane, where he finished 11th and 20th.  For the 2007/2008 season he started his first full season in the tournament, competing 20 times and ending in 24th position, despite numerous top 15 and even a top 10 finish.

Death
On August 7, 2008, Rainer was paragliding over his town of Maria Alm.  He got into difficulty at approximately 20 meters (66 ft) and crashed.  He was rushed to hospital in Innsbruck, where he was found to have numerous broken bones.  He subsequently was placed in a deep coma, and died on August 16 as a result of injuries sustained in the accident.

References

1987 births
2008 deaths
Sport deaths in Austria
Austrian male Nordic combined skiers
Austrian soldiers
People from Saalfelden
Sportspeople from Salzburg (state)